The 2001–02 Liechtenstein Cup was the fifty-seventh season of Liechtenstein's annual cup competition. Seven clubs competed with a total of fifteen teams for one spot in the qualifying round of the UEFA Cup. Defending champions were FC Vaduz, who have won the cup continuously since 1998.

First round

|colspan="3" style="background-color:#99CCCC; text-align:center;"| 16 October 2001

|-
|colspan="3" style="background-color:#99CCCC; text-align:center;"| 17 October 2001

|}

Quarterfinals 

|colspan="3" style="background-color:#99CCCC; text-align:center;"| 6 November 2001

|-
|colspan="3" style="background-color:#99CCCC; text-align:center;"| 7 November 2001

|}

Semifinals 

|colspan="3" style="background-color:#99CCCC; text-align:center;"| 25 April 2002

|-
|colspan="3" style="background-color:#99CCCC; text-align:center;"| 1 May 2002

|}

Final

External links 
Official site of the LFV
RSSSF page

Liechtenstein Football Cup seasons
Cup
Liechtenstein Cup